La Bastide-Solages is a commune in the Aveyron department in the Occitanie region of southern France.

The inhabitants of the commune are known as Solageois or Solageoises.

Geography
La Bastide-Solages is located some 25 km east by north-east of Albi and 28 km east by south-east of Carmaux just inside the Parc Naturel Regional des Grands Causses. The north-western and southern borders of the commune are the departmental border with Tarn. Access to the commune is by the D555 which branches from the D33 east of the commune and comes west through the village then north to rejoin the D33 north of the commune. The D665 branches from the D555 in the south of the commune and follows the southern border west to a bridge across the Tarn which links to the D172. Apart from the village there are the hamlets of La Carriere Basse, Cayssials, La Carriere Haute, La Bastide, and Le Bousquet. The commune is farmland in the middle with forests in the east and west.

The river Tarn forms the whole north-western border as it flows south-west to eventually join the Garonne at Boudou. The Rance river forms the southern border of the commune as it flows west to join the Tarn at the western tip of the commune.

Toponymy
La Bastide-Solages appears as la Baftide Teulat on the 1750 Cassini Map and as la Baftide on the 1790 version.

Administration

List of Successive Mayors

Demography
In 2017 the commune had 108 inhabitants. Between 1833 and 1874, it was part of the commune of Plaisance.

Bibliography
Christian-Pierre Bedel, Sent-Sarnin, Balaguièr, Brasc, Combret, Copiac, La Bastida-Solatges, La Sèrra, La Val-Ròca-Cesièira, Martrinh, Montclar, Montfranc, Plasença, Postòmis, Sant-Jòri / Christian-Pierre Bedel et les habitants del canton de Sent-Sarnin, Rodez, Mission départementale de la culture, 1992, Al canton collection, 232 pages, ill., cov. ill. 28 cm, ISSN 1151-8375, BnF 35529736f

See also
Communes of the Aveyron department

References

Communes of Aveyron